Paul Nikolaevich Evdokimov (August 2 [O.S. July 20], 1901 – September 16, 1970) was an Orthodox Christian theologian, professor at the St. Sergius Orthodox Theological Institute, and émigré.

Paul Evdokimov's theological thought is marked by the attempt to synthesise two important currents in 20th century Orthodox thought, namely the "neo-patristic" renewal and the insights of the Russian religious philosophers.

Personal life 
Born in Saint Petersburg to a noble family, Evdokimov was forced to leave Russia in the wake of the October Revolution. Fleeing first to Constantinople (now Istanbul), the family then moved to Paris, where a large community of Russian émigrés had found refuge. In this milieu, Evdokimov met and collaborated with leading émigré thinkers such as Sergei Bulgakov and Nikolai Berdyaev.

In 1927, Paul Evdokimov married Natasha Brunel, a French teacher of Russian origin, and moved to Menton, Provence. With the advent of World War II and the Italian occupation of Menton, the family moved to Valence, Drôme. In 1942, Evdokimov defended his PhD thesis on Dostoyevsky and the problem of evil.

The end of the war coincided with Brunel's death from cancer, and the family relocated to Paris. There Evdokimov became involved in the French Resistance via the Cimade refugee aid group. This work continued after the end of the war, and in 1953, Paul became a professor in the St. Sergius Orthodox Theological Institute in Paris.

Paul Evdokimov remarried in 1954, to Tomoko Sakaï, an English-Japanese interpreter. From 1958 to 1961, he published several books on Orthodox theology. Evdokimov continued to participate in ecumenical organisations throughout the 1960s, and received a doctorate honoris causa from the University of Thessaloniki. He died in his sleep on September 16, 1970.

It had the following influences: Sergei Bulgakov, Nikolai Berdyaev, Nicholas Afanasiev, Lev Gillet, Anton Kartashev, Georgy Fedotov,  Carl Jung, Fyodor Dostoevsky, Simone Weil, Dietrich Bonhoeffer, Simone de Beauvoir and Sigmund Freud.

Works 

 Dostoïevski et le problème du mal (1942)
 Le Mariage, sacrement de l'amour (1944)
 La Femme et le salut du monde (1958)
 L'Orthodoxie (1959), for which Evdokimov received a doctorate from the St. Sergius Institute.
 Gogol et Dostoïevski ou la descente aux enfers (1961)
 Le Sacrement de l'amour: Le mystère conjugal à la lumière de la tradition orthodoxe (1962)
 Les Âges de la vie spirituelle: Des pères du desert à nos jours (1964)
 La Connaissance de Dieu selon la tradition orientale (1968)
 L'Esprit-Saint dans la tradition orthodoxe (1969)
 Le Christ dans la pensée russe and L'Art de l'icône: Théologie de la beauté (1970)

References 

1901 births
1970 deaths
White Russian emigrants to France
20th-century Eastern Orthodox theologians